Ramona Siebenhofer (born 29 July 1991) is a World Cup alpine ski racer from Austria.

Born in Tamsweg, Salzburg, Siebenhofer made her World Cup debut in December 2009 in Lienz, Austria. She attained her first World Cup podium in December 2015, a third place in downhill at Lake Louise, Canada.

World Cup results

Season standings
{| class=wikitable style="text-align:center"
!Season !! Age !!  Overall  !!  Slalom  !! Giant slalom  !! Super-G !! Downhill !!Combined
|-
| 2010 ||18|| 90 || — || 30 || — || — || —
|-
| 2011 ||19|| rowspan=3 colspan=6|0 points
|-
| 2012 ||20
|-
| 2013 ||21
|-
| 2014 ||22|| 62 || — || 39 || 46 || 37 || 7 
|-
| 2015 ||23|| 70 || — || 40 || 42 || 37 || 13 
|-
| 2016 ||24|| 47 || — || 38 || 32 || 18 || 34 
|-
| 2017 ||25|| 39 || — || — ||31 ||17 || 13
|-
| 2018 ||26|| 29 || — || — ||21 ||19 || 6
|-
| 2019 ||27|| 15 || — || — ||19 ||bgcolor="cc9966"|3 || 17
|-
| 2020 ||28|| 27 || — || 31 ||31 || 22 || 5
|-
| 2021 ||29|| 15 || — || 12 ||48 || 10 || rowspan="3" 
|-
| 2022 ||30||12||— ||14||16||4
|-
| 2023 ||31||26||—||24||12||25|}

Race podiums
 2 wins – (2 DH)
 7 podiums – (7 DH); 36 top tens

World Championship results

Olympic results

References

External links
 
 
 
 Austrian Ski team (ÖSV) – official site – Ramona Siebenhofer –   – ''

1991 births
Living people
Austrian female alpine skiers
People from Tamsweg District
Alpine skiers at the 2018 Winter Olympics
Alpine skiers at the 2022 Winter Olympics
Olympic alpine skiers of Austria
Sportspeople from Salzburg (state)
20th-century Austrian women
21st-century Austrian women